Paolo Bellucci (born 18 January 1986 in Gualdo Tadino) is an Italian association football forward who currently plays for A.S. Gualdo Calcio.

Appearances on Italian Series 

Serie A : 0 Apps

Serie B : 0 Apps

Serie C1 : 2 Apps

Serie C2 : 24 Apps, 1 Goal

Serie D : 41 Apps, 12 Goals

Eccellenza : 201 Apps, 55 Goals

Promozione : 77 Apps, 17 Goals

Total : 345 Apps, 85 Goals

External links
http://www.gualdocalcio.it/squadra0910/bellucci.htm

1986 births
Living people
People from Gualdo Tadino
Italian footballers
Footballers from Umbria
Association football forwards
A.S. Gualdo Casacastalda players
A.S.D. Città di Foligno 1928 players
Sportspeople from the Province of Perugia